The Trusts of Land and Appointment of Trustees Act 1996 (c 47), usually called "TLATA" or "TOLATA", is an Act of Parliament of the United Kingdom, which altered the law in relation to trusts of land in England, Wales, Scotland and Northern Ireland.

Background
The Act came into force on 1 January 1997 and was a result of a recognised need for reform of the part of the Law of Property Act 1925 which dealt with trusts. It also implemented recommendations made in a number of Law Commission reports. Some problems included the fact that it was hard to establish a trust without it coming under the auspices of the Settled Land Act 1925, which brought with it a range of problems. In particular, the co-owners of property were regarded as having beneficial interests in money and not in the land. Problems arose where partners disagreed over when they wanted to sell a property – usually in the case of separation, and this led to situations where spouses and children might find themselves without their customary home inequitably.

One of the key features of the Act is to try to redress this by the imposition of statutory considerations to be taken into account when dealing with the disposition of trusts and ordering a sale of a family home.

Contents
The Act consists of three parts: Part I deals with the handling of trusts in land, Part II deals with the appointment of trustees, and Part III contains definitions, interpretation provisions and miscellany.

Part I: Trusts of Land 
Notable requirements come from two parts of the legislation, sections 14 and 15, where the considerations for determining applications are dealt with. Secondly, the imposition of section 335a in the Insolvency Act 1986.

Section 15
  The matters to which the court is to have regard in determining an application for an order under section 14 include –
  
       the intentions of the person or persons (if any) who created the trust,
    
    the purposes for which the property subject to the trust is held,
    
    the welfare of any minor who occupies or might reasonably be expected to occupy any land subject to the trust as his home, and
    the interest of any secured creditor of any beneficiary.
  

Insolvency Act 1986, S. 335a
(3) Where such an application is made after the end of the period of one year beginning with the first vesting under chapter IV of this part of the bankrupt's estate in a trustee, the court shall assume, unless the circumstances of the case are exceptional, that the interests of the bankrupt's creditors outweigh all other considerations.

Part II: Appointment of trustees 
Section 19 of the Act allows beneficiaries of a trust (who are all "of full age and capacity") to appoint new trustees or remove or replace existing trustees except when a trust instrument does not contain any provision for apppointing trustees. This statutory provision mirrors the existing common law rule in Saunders v Vautier allowing a beneficiary to wind up a trust. This provision reverses the decision in Re Brockbank—under that ruling, beneficiaries could achieve the same end result as they can under Section 19 by terminating the trust under the Vautier rule, then creating a new trust (although this may come with both bureaucratic complexity and undesirable tax consequences).

Section 20 sets out a procedure for replacing a trustee who lacks capacity under the Mental Capacity Act 2005. These provisions are necessary as a trustee lacking mental capacity would not be able to retire from his role as trustee under s39 of the Trustee Act 1925 as they lack the capacity to retire, and situations may arise where the only remaining trustee loses mental capacity.

Case law
In 2001, in the Case of Re Shaire, Neuberger J assessed the requirements of TLATA in the light of the case before him and stated that the statute had intended "to tip the balance somewhat more in favour of families and against banks and other charges", when assessing a claim.

See also

English land law
English trusts law

References

External links
 

Wills and trusts in the United Kingdom
Property law of the United Kingdom
United Kingdom Acts of Parliament 1996
English trusts law
Housing legislation in the United Kingdom